Ernest Lesigne was a 19th-century French journalist and historian.

One of his most famous works he wrote is a series of socialist letters, titled "Socialistic Letters", for the French radical paper Le Radical.

External links 
 Ernest Lesigne on "The Two Socialisms"
 "Socialistic Letters: The socialization of the means of production is a dogma." Translated by Benjamin Tucker, in Liberty IV.25 (July 16, 1887). 6.
 "Socialistic Letters: Socialism is the opposite of governmentalism." Translated by Benjamin Tucker, in Liberty V.2 (August 27, 1887). 7.
 "Socialistic Letters: There are two Socialisms." Translated by Benjamin Tucker, in Liberty V.10 (December 17, 1887). 5.
 "Socialistic Letters: Property is liberty." Translated by Benjamin Tucker, in Liberty V.11 (December 31, 1887). 6.
 "Socialistic Letters: In the near future all laborers ... will have their own machines." Translated by Benjamin Tucker, in Liberty V.12 (January 14, 1888). 5.
 "Socialistic Letters: Cooperation a panacea?" Translated by Benjamin Tucker, in Liberty V.14 (February 11, 1888). 7.
 "Boulangism and Laborers’ Service-Books." From Le Radical, translated by Benjamin Tucker, in Liberty VII.3 (June 7, 1890). 2-3.

References 

19th-century French writers
Year of birth missing
Year of death missing
French socialists